...And Justice for All is a 1979 American legal comedy-drama film directed by Norman Jewison and starring Al Pacino, Jack Warden and John Forsythe. Lee Strasberg, Jeffrey Tambor, Christine Lahti, Craig T. Nelson and Thomas Waites appear in supporting roles. The Oscar-nominated screenplay was written by Valerie Curtin and Barry Levinson.

The film includes a well-known scene in which Pacino's character yells, "You're out of order! You're out of order! The whole trial is out of order! They're out of order!" It was filmed in Baltimore, including the courthouse area. It received two Academy Award nominations: Best Leading Actor (Pacino) and Best Original Screenplay (Curtin and Levinson).

Plot
Arthur Kirkland, a Baltimore defense attorney, is in jail on a contempt of court charge after punching Judge Henry T. Fleming while arguing the case of Jeff McCullaugh. McCullaugh was stopped for a minor traffic offense, then mistaken for a killer of the same name, and has already spent a year and a half in jail without being guilty of a crime. Fleming has repeatedly stymied Kirkland's efforts to have the case reviewed. Although there is strong new evidence that McCullaugh is innocent, Fleming refuses to consider his appeal due to its late submission, so he remains in prison. Kirkland then starts a new case, defending Ralph Agee, a young black cross-dresser arrested for a robbery, who is terrified of being sent to prison.

Kirkland pays regular visits to his grandfather Sam, in a nursing home, who is progressively becoming senile. It is revealed that Kirkland was abandoned by his parents at a young age, and it was Sam who raised him and put him through law school. Kirkland also begins a romance with a legal ethics committee member, Gail Packer.

Kirkland has a friendly relationship with Judge Francis Rayford, who takes him on a hair-raising ride in his personal helicopter. Rayford laughs in amusement as he tests how far he can fly before running out of fuel. Meanwhile, Kirkland is terrified and begs him to land; Rayford eventually crashes his helicopter in knee-deep water. Rayford, a Korean War veteran, is borderline suicidal and keeps a rifle in his chambers at the courthouse and an M1911 pistol in his shoulder holster at all times. He even eats his lunch on a ledge outside his office window, four stories up.

One day, unexpectedly, Kirkland is requested to defend Judge Fleming, who has been accused of brutally assaulting and raping a young woman. As the two loathe each other, Fleming feels that having the person who publicly hates him argue his innocence will be to his advantage. Fleming blackmails Kirkland with an old violation of lawyer-client confidentiality, for which Kirkland will likely be disbarred if it were to come to light.

Kirkland's friend and partner, Jay Porter, is also unstable. He feels guilt for gaining acquittals for defendants who were truly guilty of violent crimes. Porter shows up drunk at Kirkland's apartment, after one of his (guilty) clients kills two kids following his acquittal. After a violent breakdown inside the courthouse – wherein he ends up throwing dinner plates at everybody in the hallway – Porter is taken to a hospital. Before leaving in the ambulance, Kirkland asks another partner, Warren Fresnell, to handle Agee's court hearing in his absence. Kirkland gives Fresnell a corrected version of Agee's probation report and stresses that it must be shown to the judge so that Agee will receive probation, rather than serve jail time. Fresnell shows up late and forgets to give the judge the corrected version, causing Agee to be sentenced to jail time. Kirkland is livid and attacks Fresnell's car, revealing that 30 minutes after he was sentenced, Agee committed suicide. Meanwhile, Jeff McCullaugh, who has been sexually and physically assaulted by other inmates, finally snaps and takes two hostages. Kirkland pleads with him to surrender, promising to get him out, but a police sniper shoots and kills McCullaugh when he moves in front of a window.

A clearly disturbed Kirkland takes on Judge Fleming's case. He tries to talk the prosecuting attorney, Frank Bowers, into throwing the case out but Bowers, who recognizes the prestige that convicting a judge would earn him, refuses to back down. Kirkland meets with another client, Carl Travers, who offers photographs proving that Fleming engaged in BDSM acts with a prostitute. Gail Packer warns Kirkland not to betray a client, revealing that the ethics committee has been keeping their eye on him ever since the contempt of court incident. Kirkland shows the pictures to Fleming, who freely admits he is guilty of the rape.

As the trial opens, Fleming, while looking at the victim, makes a casual remark to Kirkland that he "wouldn't mind seeing her again sometime." Kirkland's face indicates his disgust. In his opening statement, Kirkland begins by mocking Bowers' case while speculating on the ultimate objective of the American legal system. He appears to be making a strong case to exonerate Fleming – but then, unexpectedly, he bursts out that the prosecution is not going to get Fleming, because he is going to get him and declares that his client is guilty. Judge Rayford yells that Kirkland is "out of order," to which Kirkland retorts, "You're out of order! You're out of order! The whole trial is out of order! They're out of order!" Kirkland is dragged out of the courtroom, venting his rage all the way and condemning Fleming for his and the legal system's abuse of the law. As the courtroom spectators cheer for Kirkland – including Gail Packer – Fleming sits down in defeat, and a fed-up Rayford storms out.

In the end, Kirkland sits on the courthouse's steps, knowing his antics will probably cost him his career in law. An apparently uncured Jay Porter passes by, and tips his wig to Kirkland in a greeting, leaving him sitting on the steps in utter disbelief.

Cast

Production
The film was filmed in Baltimore, including the courthouse area, the Washington Monument of the Mount Vernon district, and Fort McHenry. Pacino practiced the "You're out of order!" scene 26 times at the building ledge.

Release
The film premiered as the closing night gala presentation at the Toronto International Film Festival on September 15, 1979.

Reception
...And Justice for All opened to critical acclaim and box office success. Produced on a modest budget of $4 million, it grossed over $33.3 million in North America, making it the 24th highest-grossing film of 1979. The film received mostly positive reviews from critics, earning an 82% rating on the review aggregator website Rotten Tomatoes based on 33 reviews. The website's consensus reads, "A volcanic Al Pacino holds court in this histrionic legal drama, the star grounding a tonally imbalanced script with the conviction of his impassioned performance." Brian W. Fairbanks in the book The Late Show called the film's screenplay "overly contrived", despite Pacino's "trademark" phrase in the courtroom. Zagat gave the film 23 of 30 possible points overall; the quality of acting a score of 26 of 30, and story and production 22 each, where 20 to 25 represents "very good to excellent"; 26 to 30 "extraordinary to perfection". The Empire magazine called it a "solid but slightly clichéd courtroom drama" and rated it three stars out of five.

Kirkland's opening courtroom statement near the film's ending, as well as his subsequent outburst "You're out of order! You're out of order! The whole trial is out of order! They're out of order!" (commonly misquoted as "I'm out of order?! You're out of order! This whole courtroom is out of order!"), has been often discussed: Filmsite named the ending one of the Best Film Speeches and Monologues. MSN Canada noted that the whole phrase is one of the top 10 "misquoted movie lines".

The film received two Academy Award nominations. Al Pacino was nominated for Best Actor, and Valerie Curtin and Barry Levinson were nominated for Best Original Screenplay. Pacino was also nominated for a Golden Globe for his performance.

Legacy
The line "You're out of order! You're out of order! The whole trial is out of order! They're out of order!" has been parodied many times in popular media, such as in The Simpsons and The Big Bang Theory. It is also echoed in Pacino's speech in the film Scent of a Woman.

References
Notes

Bibliography

External links

 
 
 
 
 

1979 films
1970s English-language films
1979 drama films
1970s legal films
1970s satirical films
American courtroom films
American legal drama films
American satirical films
Columbia Pictures films
Juries in fiction
Films about lawyers
Films directed by Norman Jewison
Films scored by Dave Grusin
Films set in Baltimore
Films shot in Maryland
1970s American films